Ivan L. Moody (born Ivan Lewis Greening on January 7, 1980) is an American singer and songwriter who is the lead vocalist of heavy metal band Five Finger Death Punch (FFDP). He performed for several other bands including Motograter and Ghost Machine before joining FFDP. Moody was known by the pseudonym "Ghost" during his time with Motograter.

Early life 
Moody was born Ivan Lewis Greening in Denver, Colorado. Growing up, he lived in several smaller cities in the area, including Arvada, Castle Rock, Lakewood, Wheat Ridge, and Northglenn. He said he spent a few summers with his grandmother in La Crosse, Wisconsin. "My grandmother put me in choir when I was about seven years old. I was only in it about two or three years. Music's always been real close to my heart. Like anybody else, there were ups and downs in my life and music just always seemed to be consistent, so it was easy to latch on to. I started singing in bands when I was 16 years old. They used to kick me out of bars after my set was done."

Career

Moody moved to Los Angeles in 2001, adopting the surname of Billy Moody, who had married his mother and was "like a father to me." (The Jasta Show - Episode 28 39m00s). In L.A. he joined his first band called Toiz. The band played a few shows around the Los Angeles area in 2002 and made a demo which was not released. The following year, he joined the nu metal band Motograter. They released their self-titled studio album on June 24, 2003. They gained some mainstream success playing the second stage at Ozzfest 2003 and touring with bands like Korn, Disturbed, Marilyn Manson, Nothingface, Slipknot, Mushroomhead, and Killswitch Engage. Motograter went on a hiatus in 2005 but played a one-time reunion show in 2006 at the Delicious Rox Festival. Moody also made songs with old roommates and family members, Ryan Morrow (bass), Bill Stonebraker (guitar), and Jim "Dugan" Demongey (drums), calling themselves Black Blood Orchestra.

Moody joined the heavy metal band Five Finger Death Punch and his side project Ghost Machine released their debut self-titled album on July 26, 2005. Ghost Machine released their second album, Hypersensitive, on November 21, 2006. In the same year, Five Finger Death Punch entered the studio to record their debut album at Next Level Studios and Complex Studios in Los Angeles with Steve Bruno and Mike Sarkisyan. The album was produced by guitarist Zoltan Bathory and drummer Jeremy Spencer and was mixed by former Machine Head and Soulfly guitarist Logan Mader.

Five Finger Death Punch achieved rapid commercial success: their debut album, The Way of the Fist (2007) has currently sold over 600,000 copies in the United States and spawned three top 10 singles. Their second album, War is the Answer (2009), sold more than 44,000 copies in its first week of release, spawned five top 10 singles, and has gone on to sell more than 700,000 copies. Their even more successful third record American Capitalist debuted number 3 on the Billboard 200 chart and sold over 90,000 copies in its first week. It was the band's third consecutive RIAA-certified Gold record. On July 30, 2013, The Wrong Side of Heaven and the Righteous Side of Hell, Volume 1 was released, selling over 210,000 copies. Roughly four months later, The Wrong Side of Heaven and the Righteous Side of Hell, Volume 2 was released, rising to number 2 on the Billboard 200, and notable for its single, "Battle Born". 

Five Finger Death Punch played many major tours and festivals, including Korn's Family Values and Bitch We Have a Problem tours, the Jägermeister Stage at Mayhem Festival in 2008 and the main stage at Mayhem Festival in 2010 and 2013. They also performed at Download Festival in 2009, 2010, 2013, and 2015, and the Monster Stage at Rock on the Range in Columbus, Ohio in 2008, 2010, 2012, and 2014, as well as at Rockfest 2012 in Kansas City.

Moody was interviewed for the book Full Metal: The 50 Most Influential Heavy Metal Songs of the 1980s and the True Stories Behind Their Lyrics. He discusses the impact of Metallica's "Fade to Black" on him as a lyricist, in a chapter about the song that also examines its social and cultural significance.

In 2009, Moody starred in the horror film Bled, playing the role of Incubus. He co-starred alongside Shawn Crahan in Darren Lynn Bousman's short horror musical film The Devil's Carnival, which screened in April 2012.

On June 12, 2017, Moody stated during a concert in Tilburg, Netherlands, that it will be his last show with Five Finger Death Punch. The band released a statement saying they would keep moving forward. Moody checked himself into rehab and was replaced for the remaining dates by vocalist Tommy Vext. As of December 2019, Moody had returned to touring with Five Finger Death Punch, stating he had been sober for the past 22 months (since early 2018).

Legal issues 
Moody was arrested by the Australian Federal Police on February 22, 2014, in Sydney, charged with drunkenly assaulting a female flight attendant on his Qantas flight from Brisbane. The band performed without him in Sydney and Melbourne.

On April 21, 2015, Moody was arrested in Las Vegas and charged with domestic battery by strangulation. The police were called to Moody's hotel room on a report of domestic abuse towards Holly Smith, Moody's wife of 17 years. According to the police report, Moody strangled Smith with a jiu-jitsu hold and said to her "I’m going to fucking kill you!" before repeatedly punching her. Smith was found with visible injuries and scratches at the back of her throat from a blanket being shoved into her mouth. Moody was released on $15,000 bail. The battery charges were dropped in July, but Smith filed a restraining order. Smith filed for divorce from Moody in August with evidence of a continuous pattern of domestic abuse, including photographs of her bloody eye and broken blood vessels.

In August 2015, it was revealed that Moody's sister Sandra Dykes along with his mother had also filed restraining orders against Moody. Dykes alleged that Moody has a "history of violence with women", and filed the restraining order after Moody accused her, his mother, and his daughter of stealing money from him.

Personal life

Moody has two daughters, born in 1998 and around 2013. He owns a CBD dispensary called Moody's Medicinals.

In 2012, Moody revealed that his alcoholism nearly got him fired from Five Finger Death Punch. Moody said he would perform drunk and not remember any of it the next day. Moody says that he "felt like a junkie and from that extreme, it takes a lot of effort to go back." Moody references his alcoholism and its battles in the video "I Apologize", where Moody is walking through a graveyard filled with musicians that have died struggling with addiction. In November 2016, Moody cut a concert short in Worcester, claiming that his mother was dying that night. Concertgoers reported that he appeared drunk, and was assisted off the stage. His younger sister told a reporter that their mother was "alive and well". In June 2017, Moody left a Five Finger Death Punch tour for rehab. He claims that CBD products helped him overcome his alcoholism.

Awards and nominations
Motograter was voted the best band of 2003 by Hit Parader. Five Finger Death Punch has won several awards including The Best New Band award at the 2009 Metal Hammer Golden Gods Awards, the Most Promising Artist award from FMQB's 2009 year-end Metal poll. They were also nominated for the Best International Newcomer award at 2009 Kerrang! Awards and won the Best Breakthrough Band award at the 2010 Metal Hammer Golden Gods Awards.
Best Song for "Lift Me Up" at the 2014 Metal Hammer Golden Gods Awards.

Discography

Motograter 
2003: Motograter
There are also four Motograter demos with Moody on lead vocals, including "Down (2002 Demo)", "No Name (2002 Demo)", "Red (2002 Demo)", and "Failure (Live 2004)".

Ghost Machine 
2005: Ghost Machine
2006: Hypersensitive
After Hypersensitive, Ghost Machine started working on a remix album that they had to put on the back burner because of the success of Five Finger Death Punch. Four remixes were released for stream on the band's MySpace music remix page: "God Forbid (Black Cape Remix)", "Vegas Moon (Pete Murray Remix)", "Siesta Loca (Steven's Organic Drum Remix)" and "Burning Bridges (Depression Remix)".

Five Finger Death Punch 

2007: The Way of the Fist
2009: War Is the Answer
2011: American Capitalist
2013: The Wrong Side of Heaven and the Righteous Side of Hell, Volume 1
2013: The Wrong Side of Heaven and the Righteous Side of Hell, Volume 2
2015: Got Your Six
2018: And Justice for None
2020: F8
2022: AfterLife

Guest appearances

Bibliography
Ivan Moody's Dirty Poetry (2021)

Filmography
Bled (2009) (as Incubus)
The Devil's Carnival (2012) (as the hobo clown)
The Retaliators (2021) as Vic

References

External links 

 

Living people
American heavy metal singers
Alternative metal musicians
Nu metal singers
American hard rock musicians
Singers from Denver
Five Finger Death Punch members
21st-century American singers
21st-century American male singers
1975 births